Cape Desolation, also known as 'Cape Brill', is a headland in southwest Greenland in the Kujalleq municipality.

Geography
The cape is located 16.66 km to the west-north-west of Cape Thorvaldsen near the modern settlements of Arsuk and Ivittuut. The cape is in an impressive stack of jagged cliffs with the reddish crags of the Killavaat mountain range in the background. The Outer Kitsissut (Torstein Islands) lie 9.5 km west-north-west of the cape.

References

External links
 Weather forecast for Kap Desolation, Kujalleq (Greenland)

Headlands of Greenland